As of June 2022 FORATOM officially becomes "nucleareurope".
FORATOM (Forum Atomic Européen) is the Brussels-based trade association for the nuclear energy industry in Europe. Its main purpose is to promote the use of nuclear power in Europe.

The current Director General of FORATOM is Yves Desbazeille.

FORATOM estimated that in 2016 it spent between €300,000 - €399,999 on lobbying EU institutions.

References

External links
 
 

International nuclear energy organizations
International organisations based in Belgium
International scientific organizations based in Europe